Kamren Kinchens (born September 29, 2002) is an American football safety for the Miami Hurricanes.

High school career
Kinchens attended Miami Northwestern Senior High School in Miami, Florida. He committed to the University of Miami to play college football.

College career
Kinchens played in all 12 games and started the final five of his true freshman year at Miami in 2021 and had 44 tackles. He returned to Miami as a starter in 2022. Against Georgia Tech, he tied a school record with three interceptions. He finished the year with 59 tackles, six interceptions and one touchdown. He was named a first-team All-American by CBS Sports.

References

External links
Miami Hurricanes bio

Living people
Players of American football from Miami
American football safeties
Miami Hurricanes football players
Year of birth missing (living people)